Akbar Kandi (also Romanized as Akbar Kandī; also known as Akbarkandī) is a village in Yaft Rural District, Moradlu District, Meshgin Shahr County, Ardabil Province, Iran. At the 2006 census, its population was 103, in 26 families.

References 

Towns and villages in Meshgin Shahr County